Yangjae-dong is a dong, neighbourhood of the greater Gangnam area Seocho-gu in Seoul, South Korea. Yangjae-dong is divided into 2 different dong which are Yangjae 1-dong and 2-dong.

Yangjae High School (YHS), part of Gangnam school district 8, is nearby Yangjae-dong and Torch Trinity Graduate University is located in Yangjae-dong.

History 
 July 1, 1973 Change from Yeongdeungpo District to Seongdong District.
 October 1, 1975 Change from Seongdong District to Gangnam District.
 January 1, 1988 Change from Gangnam District to Seocho District
 1992 Subdivided into Yangjae 1 and 2-dong.

Education 
 High Schools
 Yangjae High School
 Eonnam High School
 Middle Schools
 Eonnam Middle School
 Rainbow International School
 Elementary Schools
 Maeheon Elementary School
 Yangjae Elementary School

Transportation
 Yangjae Citizen's Forest Station of 
 Cheonggyesan Station of

See also 

Administrative divisions of South Korea

References

External links
Seocho-gu official website
Seocho-gu map at the Seocho-gu official website
 The Yangjae 1-dong Resident office

Neighbourhoods of Seocho District